Incantations for Percussion and Orchestra is a concerto for percussion and orchestra in three movements by the Finnish composer Einojuhani Rautavaara.  The work was composed for the percussionist Colin Currie on a joint commission from the London Philharmonic Orchestra, the Baltimore Symphony Orchestra, the Rotterdam Philharmonic Orchestra, and the Tampere Philharmonic Orchestra.  The first performance was given in Royal Festival Hall, London by Currie and the London Philharmonic Orchestra under the conductor Yannick Nézet-Séguin on October 24, 2009.

Composition

Structure
The concerto has a duration of roughly 23 minutes and is composed in three movements:
Pesante
Espressivo
Animato

Style and inspiration
Rautavaara described the origins of the piece in the score program note, writing:
Currie later recalled that when he arrived in Helsinki the composer had already finished two-thirds of the score.  After hearing Currie's input, however, Rautavaara left room for a cadenza in the third movement to be improvised by Currie.

Instrumentation
Incantations is scored for a solo percussionist and orchestra, comprising two flutes, two oboes, two clarinets, two bassoons, two French horns, three trumpets, two trombones, timpani, tubular bells, and strings.

Reception
Guy Rickards of Gramophone described the work's form as "an orthodox but compelling vehicle for Currie's blistering virtuosity" and praised the music for its "powerfully elemental undertow."  Rosie Pentreath of BBC Music Magazine similarly lauded, "It's one of Rautavaara's most immediate and colourful concertos, framed by a majestic statement of purpose. Its finale is a dizzying dance, whose improvised cadenza seems to point to the soloist as much as the composer as the shaman of the piece."  Martin Kettle of The Guardian reflected that the piece "manages to be both intensely innovative and highly conventional" and wrote:
Tom Huizenga of NPR called the work "compelling" and remarked:
He continued:

References

Compositions by Einojuhani Rautavaara
2008 compositions
Percussion concertos
Music commissioned by the Baltimore Symphony Orchestra
Music commissioned by the London Philharmonic Orchestra